Dorsets may refer to:

Dorset culture
Dorset Regiment